The  is an A class river in Shizuoka Prefecture of central Japan.

The Kano River originates from Mount Amagi in central Izu Peninsula and follows a generally northern path into Suruga Bay at Numazu. The Izu Peninsula is characterized by heavy rainfall, and the Kano River has a steep gradient with rapid flow and is prone to flooding. During Typhoon Ida in September 1958, the river caused heavy damage to towns along its banks, resulting in 1269 deaths.  upriver from the river's mouth at Numazu, a flood diversion canal has been constructed to divert flood water into Suruga Bay.

The Jōren Falls, one of Japan's Top 100 Waterfalls is located in the upper reaches of the Kano River.

External links

 (confluence with Ibi River)

References 

Rivers of Shizuoka Prefecture
Rivers of Japan